The Arboretum de Bellefontaine (13 hectares) is an arboretum located in Champigneulles, Meurthe-et-Moselle, Lorraine, France. It contains specimens of beech, birch, chestnut, ginkgo, maple, oak, pine, sequoia, and spruce.

See also 
 List of botanical gardens in France

References 
 L'Echo des Chênaies entry (French)
 L'arboretum (French, with photographs)
 Nancystan entry (French)
 Georges H. Parent, "Les Hêtres tortillards, Fagus sylvatica L. var. tortuosa Pépin, de Lorraine, dans leur contexte européen", Ferrantia 48, 2006, page 28. 

Bellefontaine, Arboretum de
Bellefontaine, Arboretum de